The 1996 Eisenhower Trophy took place 14 to 17 November on the Masters and Legends courses at Manila Southwoods Golf and Country Club near Manila, Philippines. It was the 20th World Amateur Team Championship for the Eisenhower Trophy. The tournament was a 72-hole stroke play team event with 47 four-man teams. The best three scores for each round counted towards the team total.

Australia won the Eisenhower Trophy for the third time, finishing 11 strokes ahead of the silver medalists, Sweden. Spain took the bronze medal with Canada in fourth place. Kalle Aitala, representing Finland, had the lowest individual score, 12-under-par 276.

Teams
47 four-man teams contested the event.

The following table lists the players on the leading teams.

Scores

Source:

Individual leaders
There was no official recognition for the lowest individual scores.

Source:

References

External links
Record Book on International Golf Federation website 

Eisenhower Trophy
Golf tournaments in the Philippines
Eisenhower Trophy
Eisenhower Trophy
Eisenhower Trophy